Tom McInnis may refer to:
 Tom McInnis (Canadian politician)
 Tom McInnis (North Carolina politician)

See also
 Thomas McInnes (disambiguation)